Events from the year 2011 in Indonesia

Incumbents

Events
 January 28
 A massive fire broke out on MV Laut Teduh 2, causing 27 deaths and hundreds of injuries.
 At least 5 people were killed and 35 others were injured after two passenger trains collided at a train station in Banjar, West Java.
 February 12 - A Sabang Merauke Raya Air Charter CASA C-212 carrying two crew members and three passengers crashed during a test flight in Tanjung Pinang, Riau Islands. All five people on board were killed.
 March 11 - At least 67 houses were damaged and one person was killed after a tsunami, which originated from Japan, struck Jayapura.
 April 15 - 2011 Cirebon bombing, a suicide bomber attacked a mosque inside a police compound in Cirebon. At least 28 people were injured.
 May 7 - Merpati Nusantara Airlines Flight 8968 crashes into the sea while on approach to Kaimana, Papua. All 25 people on board were killed.
 August 3 - A Nyaman Air Service Bell 420 crashed onto Dua Saudara Mountain in Bitung, North Sulawesi. All 10 people on board were killed.
 August 27 - MV Windu Karsa capsized off the coast of Lambesina Island in Kolaka Regency, Southeast Sulawesi. At least 13 people were killed and 23 others were missing.
 September 25 - A suicide bombing struck a cathedral in Solo. At least 28 people were injured in the attack. The perpetrator was the sole fatality.
 September 29 - Nusantara Buana Air Flight 823, a CASA C-212 carrying 18 passengers and crews, crashes into the jungle of Sumatra while enroute to Aceh, killing all aboard.
 November 18–19 - Sixth East Asia Summit

Television

Debuted

 Big Brother
 MasterChef Indonesia

Ended

 Katakan Katamu
 Putri yang Ditukar

Sport

 2011 Indonesia national football team results
 2010–11 in Indonesian football
 2011 FIBA Asia Championship qualification
 2011 Asian Men's Club Volleyball Championship 
 2011 Commonwealth Bank Tournament of Champions 
 2011 Indonesia Open Grand Prix Gold 
 2011 ASEAN Para Games
 2011 Southeast Asian Games
 Indonesia at the 2011 Southeast Asian Games 
 Indonesia at the 2011 World Championships in Athletics 
 Indonesia at the 2011 World Aquatics Championships 
 Indonesia at the 2011 Summer Universiade

 
Indonesia
2010s in Indonesia
Years of the 21st century in Indonesia
Indonesia